Magic Bird was a cargo airline based in Amsterdam, Netherlands. It operates services between Sundsvall and Stockholm for the post office in Sweden. Its main base is Amsterdam Schiphol Airport.

History
The airline started operations in April 2006, was owned by an unnamed Luxembourg holding company, and had 12 employees (at March 2007). It was the successor to Magic Blue Airlines which went out of business in December 2005. 
Magic Bird ceased operations in May 2007 and was declared bankrupt on 3 July 2007.

Fleet
The Magic Bird fleet includes the following aircraft (at June 2007):
2 BAe ATP
2 Fokker 50F

In June 2006, it was reported that the airline would soon add a second BAe ATP freighter to its fleet  and in December 2006 Magic Bird leased an ATP freighter to Atlantic Airlines. In April 2007 the airline leased two ex-Newair Fokker 50F freighters.

References

External links
Magic Bird

Defunct airlines of the Netherlands
Airlines established in 2006
Airlines disestablished in 2007
2006 establishments in the Netherlands
2007 disestablishments in the Netherlands
Defunct cargo airlines